North Cape May is an unincorporated community and census-designated place (CDP) located within Lower Township in Cape May County, New Jersey, United States. It is part of the Ocean City Metropolitan Statistical Area. At the 2010 United States Census, the CDP's population was 3,226. The Cape May–Lewes Ferry departs from the area. North Cape May is mostly a residential community, with no hotels but many vacation homes. Many people retire to the community.

North Cape May had existed as an independent borough, formed by an act of the New Jersey Legislature on March 19, 1928, from portions of Lower Township. The borough remained independent until April 30, 1945, when it was returned to Lower Township. The borough had a population of 5 at the 1930 Census, which increased to 8 by 1940.

Geography
According to the United States Census Bureau, the CDP had a total area of 1.494 square miles (3.870 km2), including 1.457 square miles (3.773 km2) of land and 0.037 square miles (0.096 km2) of water (2.49%).

Demographics

Census 2010

Census 2000
As of the 2000 United States Census there were 3,618 people, 1,544 households, and 1,008 families residing in the CDP. The population density was 997.8/km2 (2,583.4/mi2). There were 2,090 housing units at an average density of 576.4/km2 (1,492.3/mi2). The racial makeup of the CDP was 94.42% White, 2.79% African American, 0.44% Native American, 0.47% Asian, 0.75% from other races, and 1.13% from two or more races. Hispanic or Latino of any race were 2.16% of the population.

There were 1,544 households, out of which 27.0% had children under the age of 18 living with them, 48.1% were married couples living together, 13.7% had a female householder with no husband present, and 34.7% were non-families. 29.6% of all households were made up of individuals, and 15.5% had someone living alone who was 65 years of age or older. The average household size was 2.33 and the average family size was 2.88.

In the CDP the population was spread out, with 22.8% under the age of 18, 6.0% from 18 to 24, 26.3% from 25 to 44, 24.2% from 45 to 64, and 20.7% who were 65 years of age or older. The median age was 42 years. For every 100 females, there were 86.7 males. For every 100 females age 18 and over, there were 81.3 males.

The median income for a household in the CDP was $37,071, and the median income for a family was $42,161. Males had a median income of $33,036 versus $26,875 for females. The per capita income for the CDP was $18,420. About 1.0% of families and 4.1% of the population were below the poverty line, including 3.1% of those under age 18 and 3.0% of those age 65 or over.

Wineries
 Cape May Winery & Vineyard
 Turdo Vineyards & Winery

Parks and recreation
North Cape May has the Lower Township municipal pool.

Education
As with other parts of Lower Township, it is served by Lower Township School District for primary grades and Lower Cape May Regional School District for secondary grades. David C. Douglass Memorial Elementary School (Pre-Kindergarten and Kindergarten) is in Villas CDP. The other three elementary schools are in Cold Spring: Carl T. Mitnick (grades 1-2), Maud Abrams (grades 3-4), and Sandman Consolidated (grades 5-6). The LCMR schools (Richard Teitelman Middle and Lower Cape May Regional High School) are in the Erma area.

Students are also eligible to attend Cape May County Technical High School in Cape May Court House, which serves students from the entire county in its comprehensive and vocational programs, which are offered without charge to students who are county residents. Special needs students may be referred to Cape May County Special Services School District in Cape May Court House.

South Cape Christian Academy, a private Christian school, opened sometime after 1976, and was located in a campus with a North Cape May postal address; as of 2010 it was outside of the North Cape May CDP. Circa 1990 it merged into Cape Christian Academy, which is now in a consolidated campus in Middle Township, with a Cape May Court House postal address and located in the CMCH CDP. Richard Degener of the Press of Atlantic City described the consolidated campus as being in Burleigh.

The nearest private Catholic school serving North Cape May is Wildwood Catholic Academy (PreK-12) in North Wildwood, which the Roman Catholic Diocese of Camden has under its supervision. Previously the area Catholic school was Our Lady Star of the Sea School in Cape May, which served as the parish school for St. John of God Church in North Cape May. In 2010 Our Lady Star of the Sea merged into Cape Trinity Regional School (PreK – 8) in North Wildwood. That school in turn merged into Wildwood Catholic Academy in 2020.

Notable people

People who were born in, residents of, or otherwise closely associated with North Cape May include:
 Bob Andrzejczak (born 1986), politician who represented the 1st Legislative District in the New Jersey General Assembly from 2013 to 2019 and in the New Jersey Senate in 2019.
 Chris Jay, (born 1978), musician, screenwriter, actor, member of the band, Army of Freshmen.

References

External links

 The Cape May Gazette Newspaper serving North Cape May.

1928 establishments in New Jersey
1945 disestablishments in New Jersey
Census-designated places in Cape May County, New Jersey
Former boroughs in New Jersey
Lower Township, New Jersey